Mari Hamada Greatest Hits is a greatest hits album by Japanese singer/songwriter Mari Hamada, released on June 16, 2000 by Universal Victor, following the end of her contract with the label. Hamada herself was not involved in the album's track selection.

The album peaked at No. 61 on Oricon's albums chart.

Track listing

Charts

References

External links 
 

2000 greatest hits albums
Japanese-language compilation albums
Mari Hamada compilation albums
Universal Music Japan albums